The 2021 cyberattacks on Sri Lanka were a series of cyberattacks on at least 10 Sri Lankan national websites including Google.lk domain.

First Cyber-Attack 
The first cyber-attack was launched on The LK Domain Registry website on 6th February 2021. The investigations are currently carried out by Sri Lanka Computer Emergency Readiness Team along with the Information Technology Society of Sri Lanka (ITSSL). Telecommunications Regulatory Commission of Sri Lanka were also tweeted regarding the Cyberattack as public alert.

Second Cyber-Attack 
The second cyber-attack was carried out on 18 May 2021.  The website of the Chinese Embassy operating in Sri Lanka, The websites of the Health Ministry, Energy Ministry and the Rajarata University websites were affected by this cyberattack.  This cyber attack conducted by a group called 'Tamil Eelam Cyber Force'.

Cyber-Attack On Prime Minister Mahinda's Website 
The official website of Sri Lankan Prime Minister Mahinda Rajapaksa was hacked on June 3rd 2021. 

The Information Technology Society Sri Lanka - ITSSL said the PM’s website was hacked in a manner in which any visitor to the website would be redirected to another website which displays content related to the Bitcoin cryptocurrency.

References 

Cyberattacks
Hacking in the 2020s
2021 in computing
Cyberattacks
Cyberattacks
Terrorist incidents in Asia in 2021
Cyberattacks
Cyberattacks